Parnassius epaphus, the common red Apollo, is a high altitude butterfly which is found in India and Nepal. It is a member of the snow Apollo genus (Parnassius) of the swallowtail family (Papilionidae). It is not considered rare.

Description

Superficially this form closely resembles Parnassius jacquemontii, but besides the structural differences of the anal pouch in the fertilized female, in markings it differs as follows:

Male: Upperside, forewing: the crimson black-encircled spots reduced to a minute subcostal dot in the black mark beyond the cell; the subhyaline (almost glass-like) terminal margin much narrower, with dentate (tooth-like) white spots in the interspaces along the actual margin; cilia white, markedly alternated with black at the apices of the veins. Hindwing: the dusky black along the dorsal margin comparatively much broader, its inner border more irregular, deeply bi-emarginate, the crimson centre to the black mark above the tornal angle entirely absent. In no specimens observed are the crimson spots centred with white. Underside: with the same glazed appearance as in jacquemontii; markings as on the upperside, but on the forewing the white dentate spots in the terminal row are larger, which give to the wing the appearance of having a subterminal as well as a post-discal transverse series of dusky-black lunules. On the hindwing the row of basal and the obliquely-placed pre-tornal spots are as in jacquemontii but of a duller shade, while as in that form all the crimson spots are broadly centred with white. Antennae differ from those of jacquemonti as they are conspicuously ringed with white. Female differs from the male in the dusky black markings on the upperside that are broader, especially the postdiscal series on the forewing: this generally forms a diffuse band and so often restricts the lunules of the white ground colour beyond it, blending as it does diffusely with the subhyaline terminal margin. Anal pouch of fertilized female differs conspicuously from that of jacquemontii female in the complete absence of the posterior high keel or carina.

Range
Afghanistan, Pakistan, Tajikistan, northern India (Himalayas and Sikkim), Nepal, Bhutan and China (Tibet, Xinjiang, Gansu, Tshingai and Szechwan). Fairly broadly distributed.

Status
It is broadly distributed across Asia and not known to be threatened. The subspecies P. e. hillensis is protected by law in India.

See also
Papilionidae
List of butterflies of India
List of butterflies of India (Papilionidae)

Cited references

Other references
 
 Sakai S., Inaoka S., Toshiaki A., Yamaguchi S., Watanabe Y., (2002) The Parnassiology. The Parnassius Butterflies, A Study in Evolution, Kodansha, Japan.
 Weiss J.-C., (2005) Parnassiinae of the World - Part 4, Hillside Books, Canterbury, UK.
 Selected articles by Eisner for the Leiden Museum Search

Further reading
sv:Parnassius epaphus - Swedish Wikipedia provides further references and synonymy

epaphus
Insects of Pakistan
Butterflies described in 1879